Julius Brown (11 April 2005) is a United States Virgin Islands international soccer player who plays as a midfielder.

Career statistics

International

References

Living people
United States Virgin Islands soccer players
United States Virgin Islands international soccer players
Association football midfielders
Year of birth missing (living people)